Krāslava Parish is an administrative unit of Krāslava Municipality, Latvia.

References 

 

Parishes of Latvia
Krāslava Municipality